Cottus reinii is a species of freshwater ray-finned fish belonging to the family Cottidae, the typical sculpins. It is endemic to Japan, occurring from from Aomori prefecture to Wakayama prefecture in eastern Honshu and Tokushima and Kochi prefectures on Shikoku . It reaches a maximum length of 12.0 cm (4.7 in).

References

Cottus (fish)
Fish of Japan
Taxa named by Franz Martin Hilgendorf
Fish described in 1879